Thomas Peak is a peak (2,040 m) at the west side of Malta Plateau, situated on the ridge between Wilhelm and Olson Glaciers in the Victory Mountains, Victoria Land. Mapped by United States Geological Survey (USGS) from surveys and U.S. Navy air photos, 1960–64. Named by Advisory Committee on Antarctic Names (US-ACAN) for Francis J. Thomas, biologist at McMurdo Station, 1962–63 and 1964–65.
 

Mountains of Victoria Land